Pieter Wilhelmus Scharroo (16 September 1883 – 19 August 1963) was a Dutch military commander in charge during the Battle of Rotterdam. While he was trying to negotiate a ceasefire with his German counterparts, the Rotterdam Blitz took place. He was frustrated after the bombing, and refused to continue the negotiations with the German army.

Scharroo was born in The Hague. Prior to the Second World War, he had an impressive civil and military career in the Netherlands as well as the Dutch East Indies. Scharroo was also a long-time member of the International Olympic Committee. 

After the war he retired from the army and started a career as a hydrological adviser. He died, aged 79, in his home city of The Hague. He was never decorated for his attempts to defend the city of Rotterdam.

References 

1883 births
1963 deaths
Dutch colonels
Military personnel from The Hague
Royal Netherlands Army officers
Royal Netherlands Army personnel of World War II